Sayyida Makhfi-Badakhshi (1876-1963); was a poet from Afghanistan. Her first publication was between in 1992 by a monthly magazine. In the 1990s, her first collection of poetry was published in Faizabad, Afghanistan. Only few of her works have been translated into English. Sayyida was famous for her ghazals.

Life
Sayyida Makhfi-Badakhshi was educated privately until she moved from Kholm to Badakhshan. She had two brother's, Mir Muhammad Ghamgin and Mir Suhrab Shah Sawda, who were also poets. In 1951, she made an impression on contemporary poet Khalilullah Khalili.

Between 1880 and 1901, under the rule of Abdur Rahman Khan, Makhfi-Badakhshi's family was exiled to Kandahar, where they lived for 20 years.

Works
 On Sayyida (Persian)

 Publication in the monthly periodical Kābul (Kābul, Number 271, Volume 20, Issue 11, August 24, 1950).

References

1876 births
Year of death missing
Afghan women writers
20th-century Afghan poets
People from Balkh Province